Montenegro participated at 2009 Mediterranean Games, for the first time after the separation of Serbia and Montenegro. As of 2022, Montenegrin athletes have won a total of 22 medals under their flag.

Medal tables

Medals by sport

See also
 Montenegro at the Olympics
 Montenegro at the Paralympics
 Sport in Montenegro

External links
Olympic Committee of Montenegro